Charles Culver (November 17, 1892 – January 4, 1970), also known as "Charlie Calvert", was an American Negro league infielder between 1916 and 1920.

A native of Buffalo, New York, Culver made his Negro leagues debut in 1916 for the Lincoln Stars. He went on to play for the Pennsylvania Red Caps of New York and Lincoln Giants through 1920, and in 1922 broke the color barrier by playing in six games for the Montreal Royals of the Eastern Canada League. Culver died in Montreal, Quebec in 1970 at age 77.

References

External links
  and Seamheads

1892 births
1970 deaths
Lincoln Giants players
Lincoln Stars (baseball) players
Pennsylvania Red Caps of New York players
Baseball players from Buffalo, New York
20th-century African-American sportspeople
Baseball infielders
Canadian Baseball Hall of Fame inductees